The 2010 United States House of Representatives elections were held on November 2, 2010, with early voting taking place in some states in the weeks preceding that date. Voters chose representatives from all 435 congressional districts across each of the 50 U.S. states. Non-voting delegates from the District of Columbia and four of the five inhabited U.S. territories were also elected. These midterm elections took place nearly halfway through the first term of Democratic President Barack Obama. The winners served in the 112th United States Congress, with seats apportioned among the states based on the 2000 United States census. On Election Day, Democrats had held a House majority since January 2007 as a result of the 2006 elections.

Predictions on overall outcome 

These were predictions of the outcome of the 2010 United States House of Representatives elections.
 RealClearPolitics.
 As of November 2, 2010, RCP projected the Republicans would take 224 seats, the Democrats would take 167, and 44 races were toss-ups.
 Nate Silver, FiveThirtyEight (New York Times)
 As of November 2, 2010, Nate Silver's prediction model projected the Republicans would win (on average) 232.2 seats, and the Democrats would win 202.8.
 Patrick Ishmael, Hot Air.com
 Ishmael predicted on October 31, 2010, that Republicans would win a net of 63 seats, +/- 3 seats. Rasmussen Reports cited Ishmael's calls in its election preview. The week before, Ishmael predicted a net Republican pickup of 62–65 seats.
 Crystal Ball
 As of November 1, 2010, Larry Sabato predicted, "If the election were held today: + 55 Republican House seats".
 Charlie Cook
 On October 26, 2010, The Cook Political Report raised its House forecast to "a Democratic net loss of 48 to 60 seats, with higher losses possible."
 In a February 2010 interview with National Journal, he said that "it's very hard to come up with a scenario where Democrats don't lose the House. It's very hard."
 Rasmussen Reports
 On November 1, 2010, Scott Rasmussen predicted the Democrats "will likely lose 55 or more seats in the House."
 Rothenberg Political Report.
 On October 28, 2010, Rothenberg Political Report predicted "Likely Republican gain of 55–65 seats, with gains at or above 70 seats possible."
 In April 2010, Stuart Rothenberg wrote on his blog that "…the atmospherics remain strongly behind the GOP, and major Republican House gains are extremely likely" and that "it's clear that the battleground is almost entirely on Democratic soil. Obviously, control of the House is at risk."
 Congressional Quarterly.
 In October 2010, Congressional Quarterly projected the Democrats would take 195 seats, the Republicans 199, and they considered 41 races too close to call.
 In July 2010, Congressional Quarterly projected the Democrats would take 205 seats, the Republicans 190, and they considered 40 races too close to call.

Election ratings 
Several sites and individuals publish ratings of competitive seats. The seats listed below were considered competitive (not "safe" or "solid") by at least one of the rating groups. These ratings are based upon factors such as the strength of the incumbent (if the incumbent is running for re-election), the strength of the candidates, and the partisan history of the district (the Cook Partisan Voting Index is one example of this metric). Each rating describes the likelihood of a given outcome in the election.

Most election ratings use:
 Tossup: no advantage
 Tilt (sometimes used): slight advantage
 Lean: clear advantage
 Likely: strong, but not certain advantage
 Safe: outcome is nearly certain

The following table contains the final ratings of the competitiveness of selected races according to noted political analysts. Races which were considered safe for the incumbent's party are not included. Incumbents who did not run for re-election have parentheses around their name.

<div style="overflow-x:auto;>
{| class="wikitable sortable"

|- valign=bottom
! District
! Incumbent
! Cook
! Rothenberg
! CQ Politics
! Sabato's CrystalBall
! RealClear
! Winner

|-
| AL-2
|  | Bright (D)
| 
| 
| 
| 
| 
| style="background:#f66" | Roby (R)

|-
| AL-5
|  | (Griffith) (R)
| 
| 
| 
| 
| 
| style="background:#f66" | Brooks (R)

|-
| AZ-1
|  | Kirkpatrick (D)
| 
| 
| 
| 
| 
| style="background:#f66" | Gosar (R)

|-
| AZ-3
|  | (Shadegg) (R)
| 
| 
| 
| 
| 
| style="background:#f66" | Quayle (R)

|-
| AZ-5
|  | Mitchell (D)
| 
| 
| 
| 
| 
| style="background:#f66" | Schweikert (R)

|-
| AZ-7
|  | Grijalva (D)
| 
| 
| 
| 
| 
| style="background:#66f" | Grijalva (D)

|-
| AZ-8
|  | Giffords (D)
| 
| 
| 
| 
| 
| style="background:#66f" | Giffords (D)

|-
| AR-1
|  | (Berry) (D)
| 
| 
| 
| 
| 
| style="background:#f66" | Crawford (R)

|-
| AR-2
|  | (Snyder) (D)
| 
| 
| 
| 
| 
| style="background:#f66" | Griffin (R)

|-
| CA-3
|  | Lungren (R)
| 
| 
| 
| 
| 
| style="background:#f66" | Lungren (R)

|-
| CA-11
|  | McNerney (D)
| 
| 
| 
| 
| 
| style="background:#66f" | McNerney (D)

|-
| CA-18
|  | Cardoza (D)
| 
| 
| 
| 
| 
| style="background:#66f" | Cardoza (D)

|-
| CA-20
|  | Costa (D)
| 
| 
| 
| 
| 
| style="background:#66f" | Costa (D)

|-
| CA-47
|  | Sanchez (D)
| 
| 
| 
| 
| 
| style="background:#66f" | Sanchez (D)

|-
| CO-3
|  | Salazar (D)
| 
| 
| 
| 
| 
| style="background:#f66" | Tipton (R)

|-
| CO-4
|  | Markey (D)
| 
| 
| 
| 
| 
| style="background:#f66" | Gardner (R)

|-
| CO-7
|  | Perlmutter (D)
| 
| 
| 
| 
| 
| style="background:#66f" | Perlmutter (D)

|-
| CT-4
|  | Himes (D)
| 
| 
| 
| 
| 
| style="background:#66f" | Himes (D)

|-
| CT-5
|  | C. Murphy (D)
| 
| 
| 
| 
| 
| style="background:#66f" | C. Murphy (D)

|-
| DE-AL
|  | (Castle) (R)
| 
| 
| 
| 
| 
| style="background:#66f" | Carney (D)

|-
| FL-2
|  | Boyd (D)
| 
| 
| 
| 
| 
| style="background:#f66" | Southerland (R)

|-
| FL-8
|  | Grayson (D)
| 
| 
| 
| 
| 
| style="background:#f66" | Webster (R)

|-
| FL-12
|  | (Putnam) (R)
| 
| 
| 
| 
| 
| style="background:#f66" | Ross (R)

|-
| FL-22
|  | Klein (D)
| 
| 
| 
| 
| 
| style="background:#f66" | West (R)

|-
| FL-24
|  | Kosmas (D)
| 
| 
| 
| 
| 
| style="background:#f66" | Adams (R)

|-
| FL-25
|  | (M. Diaz-Balart) (R)
| 
| 
| 
| 
| 
| style="background:#f66" | Rivera (R)

|-
| GA-2
|  | S. Bishop (D)
| 
| 
| 
| 
| 
| style="background:#66f" | S. Bishop (D)

|-
| GA-8
|  | Marshall (D)
| 
| 
| 
| 
| 
| style="background:#f66" | Scott (R)

|-
| HI-1
|  | Djou (R)
| 
| 
| 
| 
| 
| style="background:#66f" | Hanabusa (D)

|-
| ID-1
|  | Minnick (D)
| 
| 
| 
| 
| 
| style="background:#f66" | Labrador (R)

|-
| IL-8
|  | Bean (D)
| 
| 
| 
| 
| 
| style="background:#f66" | Walsh (R)

|-
| IL-10
|  | (Kirk) (R)
| 
| 
| 
| 
| 
| style="background:#f66" | Dold (R)

|-
| IL-11
|  | Halvorson (D)
| 
| 
| 
| 
| 
| style="background:#f66" | Kinzinger (R)

|-
| IL-14
|  | Foster (D)
| 
| 
| 
| 
| 
| style="background:#f66" | Hultgren (R)

|-
| IL-17
|  | Hare (D)
| 
| 
| 
| 
| 
| style="background:#f66" | Schilling (R)

|-
| IN-2
|  | Donnelly (D)
| 
| 
| 
| 
| 
| style="background:#66f" | Donnelly (D)

|-
| IN-8
|  | (Ellsworth) (D)
| 
| 
| 
| 
| 
| style="background:#f66" | Bucshon (R)

|-
| IN-9
|  | Hill (D)
| 
| 
| 
| 
| 
| style="background:#f66" | Young (R)

|-
| IA-1
|  | Braley (D)
| 
| 
| 
| 
| 
| style="background:#66f" | Braley (D)

|-
| IA-2
|  | Loebsack (D)
| 
| 
| 
| 
| 
| style="background:#66f" | Loebsack (D)

|-
| IA-3
|  | Boswell (D)
| 
| 
| 
| 
| 
| style="background:#66f" | Boswell (D)

|-
| KS-3
|  | (Moore) (D)
| 
| 
| 
| 
| 
| style="background:#f66" | Yoder (R)

|-
| KY-3
|  | Yarmuth (D)
| 
| 
| 
| 
| 
| style="background:#66f" | Yarmuth (D)

|-
| KY-6
|  | Chandler (D)
| 
| 
| 
| 
| 
| style="background:#66f" | Chandler (D)

|-
| LA-2
|  | Cao (R)
| 
| 
| 
| 
| 
| style="background:#66f" | Richmond (D)

|-
| LA-3
|  | (Melancon) (D)
| 
| 
| 
| 
| 
| style="background:#f66" | Landry (R)

|-
| ME-1
|  | Pingree (D)
| 
| 
| 
| 
| 
| style="background:#66f" | Pingree (D)

|-
| ME-2
|  | Michaud (D)
| 
| 
| 
| 
| 
| style="background:#66f" | Michaud (D)

|-
| MD-1
|  | Kratovil (D)
| 
| 
| 
| 
| 
| style="background:#f66" | Harris (R)

|-
| MA-4
|  | Frank (D)
| 
| 
| 
| 
| 
| style="background:#66f" | Frank (D)

|-
| MA-5
|  | Tsongas (D)
| 
| 
| 
| 
| 
| style="background:#66f" | Tsongas (D)

|-
| MA-10
|  | (Delahunt) (D)
| 
| 
| 
| 
| 
| style="background:#66f" | Keating (D)

|-
| MI-1
|  | (Stupak) (D)
| 
| style="background:#fef" | Tossup/Tilt R
| 
| 
| 
| style="background:#f66" | Benishek (R)

|-
| MI-7
|  | Schauer (D)
| 
| 
| 
| 
| 
| style="background:#f66" | Walberg (R)

|-
| MI-9
|  | Peters (D)
| 
| 
| 
| 
| 
| style="background:#66f" | Peters (D)

|-
| MN-1
|  | Walz (D)
| 
| 
| 
| 
| 
| style="background:#66f" | Walz (D)

|-
| MN-6
|  | Bachmann (R)
| 
| 
| 
| 
| 
| style="background:#f66" | Bachmann (R)

|-
| MN-8
|  | Oberstar (D)
| 
| 
| 
| 
| 
| style="background:#f66" | Cravaack (R)

|-
| MS-1
|  | Childers (D)
| 
| 
| 
| 
| 
| style="background:#f66" | Nunnelee (R)

|-
| MS-4
|  | Taylor (D)
| 
| 
| 
| 
| 
| style="background:#f66" | Palazzo (R)

|-
| MO-3
|  | Carnahan (D)
| 
| 
| 
| 
| 
| style="background:#66f" | Carnahan (D)

|-
| MO-4
|  | Skelton (D)
| 
| 
| 
| 
| 
| style="background:#f66" | Hartzler (R)

|-
| NE-2
|  | Terry (R)
| 
| 
| 
| 
| 
| style="background:#f66" | Terry (R)

|-
| NV-3
|  | Titus (D)
| 
| 
| 
| 
| 
| style="background:#f66" | Heck (R)

|-
| NH-1
|  | Shea-Porter (D)
| 
| 
| 
| 
| 
| style="background:#f66" | Guinta (R)

|-
| NH-2
|  | (Hodes) (D)
| 
| 
| 
| 
| 
| style="background:#f66" | Bass (R)

|-
| NJ-3
|  | Adler (D)
| 
| 
| 
| 
| 
| style="background:#f66" | Runyan (R)

|-
| NJ-12
|  | Holt (D)
| 
| 
| 
| 
| 
| style="background:#66f" | Holt (D)

|-
| NM-1
|  | Heinrich (D)
| 
| 
| 
| 
| 
| style="background:#66f" | Heinrich (D)

|-
| NM-2
|  | Teague (D)
| 
| 
| 
| 
| 
| style="background:#f66" | Pearce (R)

|-
| NY-1
|  | T. Bishop (D)
| 
| 
| 
| 
| 
| style="background:#66f" | T. Bishop (D)

|-
| NY-4
|  | McCarthy (D)
| 
| 
| 
| 
| 
| style="background:#66f" | McCarthy (D)

|-
| NY-13
|  | McMahon (D)
| 
| 
| 
| 
| 
| style="background:#f66" | Grimm (R)

|-
| NY-19
|  | Hall (D)
| 
| 
| 
| 
| 
| style="background:#f66" | Hayworth (R)

|-
| NY-20
|  | S. Murphy (D)
| 
| 
| 
| 
| 
| style="background:#f66" | Gibson (R)

|-
| NY-22
|  | Hinchey (D)
| 
| 
| 
| 
| 
| style="background:#66f" | Hinchey (D)

|-
| NY-23
|  | Owens (D)
| 
| 
| 
| 
| 
| style="background:#66f" | Owens (D)

|-
| NY-24
|  | Arcuri (D)
| 
| 
| 
| 
| 
| style="background:#f66" | Hanna (R)

|-
| NY-25
|  | Maffei (D)
| 
| 
| 
| 
| 
| style="background:#f66" | Buerkle (R)

|-
| NY-29
|  | Massa (D)
| 
| 
| 
| 
| 
| style="background:#f66" | Reed (R)

|-
| NC-2
|  | Etheridge (D)
| 
| 
| 
| 
| 
| style="background:#f66" | Ellmers (R)

|-
| NC-7
|  | McIntyre (D)
| 
| 
| 
| 
| 
| style="background:#66f" | McIntyre (D)

|-
| NC-8
|  | Kissell (D)
| 
| 
| 
| 
| 
| style="background:#66f" | Kissell (D)

|-
| NC-11
|  | Shuler (D)
| 
| 
| 
| 
| 
| style="background:#66f" | Shuler (D)

|-
| ND-AL
|  | Pomeroy (D)
| 
| style="background:#fef" | Tossup/Tilt R
| 
| 
| 
| style="background:#f66" | Berg (R)

|-
| OH-1
|  | Driehaus (D)
| 
| 
| 
| 
| 
| style="background:#f66" | Chabot (R)

|-
| OH-6
|  | Wilson (D)
| 
| 
| 
| 
| 
| style="background:#f66" | Johnson (R)

|-
| OH-12
|  | Tiberi (R)
| 
| 
| 
| 
| 
| style="background:#f66" | Tiberi (R)

|-
| OH-13
|  | Sutton (D)
| 
| 
| 
| 
| 
| style="background:#66f" | Sutton (D)

|-
| OH-15
|  | Kilroy (D)
| 
| 
| 
| 
| 
| style="background:#f66" | Stivers (R)

|-
| OH-16
|  | Boccieri (D)
| 
| 
| 
| 
| 
| style="background:#f66" | Renacci (R)

|-
| OH-18
|  | Space (D)
| 
| 
| 
| 
| 
| style="background:#f66" | Gibbs (R)

|-
| OR-1
|  | Wu (D)
| 
| 
| 
| 
| 
| style="background:#66f" | Wu (D)

|-
| OR-5
|  | Schrader (D)
| 
| 
| 
| 
| 
| style="background:#66f" | Schrader (D)

|-
| PA-3
|  | Dahlkemper (D)
| 
| 
| 
| 
| 
| style="background:#f66" | Kelly (R)

|-
| PA-4
|  | Altmire (D)
| 
| 
| 
| 
| 
| style="background:#66f" | Altmire (D)

|-
| PA-6
|  | Gerlach (R)
| 
| 
| 
| 
| 
| style="background:#f66" | Gerlach (R)

|-
| PA-7
|  | (Sestak) (D)
| 
| 
| 
| 
| 
| style="background:#f66" | Meehan (R)

|-
| PA-8
|  | P. Murphy (D)
| 
| 
| 
| 
| 
| style="background:#f66" | Fitzpatrick (R)

|-
| PA-10
|  | Carney (D)
| 
| 
| 
| 
| 
| style="background:#f66" | Marino (R)

|-
| PA-11
|  | Kanjorski (D)
| 
| 
| 
| 
| 
| style="background:#f66" | Barletta (R)

|-
| PA-12
|  | Critz (D)
| 
| 
| 
| 
| 
| style="background:#66f" | Critz (D)

|-
| PA-15
|  | Dent (R)
| 
| 
| 
| 
| 
| style="background:#f66" | Dent (R)

|-
| PA-17
|  | Holden (D)
| 
| 
| 
| 
| 
| style="background:#66f" | Holden (D)

|-
| RI-1
|  | (Kennedy) (D)
| 
| 
| 
| 
| 
| style="background:#66f" | Cicilline (D)

|-
| SC-5
|  | Spratt (D)
| 
| 
| 
| 
| 
| style="background:#f66" | Mulvaney (R)

|-
| SD-AL
|  | Herseth Sandlin (D)
| 
| 
| 
| 
| 
| style="background:#f66" | Noem (R)

|-
| TN-4
|  | Davis (D)
| 
| 
| 
| 
| 
| style="background:#f66" | DesJarlais (R)

|-
| TN-6
|  | (Gordon) (D)
| 
| 
| 
| 
| 
| style="background:#f66" | Black (R)

|-
| TN-8
|  | (Tanner) (D)
| 
| 
| 
| 
| 
| style="background:#f66" | Fincher (R)

|-
| TX-17
|  | Edwards (D)
| 
| 
| 
| 
| 
| style="background:#f66" | Flores (R)

|-
| TX-23
|  | Rodriguez (D)
| 
| 
| 
| 
| 
| style="background:#f66" | Canseco (R)

|-
| TX-27
|  | Ortiz (D)
| 
| 
| 
| 
| 
| style="background:#f66" | Farenthold (R)

|-
| VA-2
|  | Nye (D)
| 
| 
| 
| 
| 
| style="background:#f66" | Rigell (R)

|-
| VA-5
|  | Perriello (D)
| 
| 
| 
| 
| 
| style="background:#f66" | Hurt (R)

|-
| VA-9
|  | Boucher (D)
| 
| 
| 
| 
| 
| style="background:#f66" | Griffith (R)

|-
| VA-11
|  | Connolly (D)
| 
| 
| 
| 
| 
| style="background:#66f" | Connolly (D)

|-
| WA-2
|  | Larsen (D)
| 
| 
| 
| 
| 
| style="background:#66f" | Larsen (D)

|-
| WA-3
|  | (Baird) (D)
| 
| 
| 
| 
| 
| style="background:#f66" | Herrera (R)

|-
| WA-8
|  | Reichert (R)
| 
| 
| 
| 
| 
| style="background:#f66" | Reichert (R)

|-
| WV-1
|  | (Mollohan) (D)
| 
| style="background:#fff" | Pure tossup
| 
| 
| 
| style="background:#f66" | McKinley (R)

|-
| WV-3
|  | Rahall (D)
| 
| 
| 
| 
| 
| style="background:#66f" | Rahall (D)

|-
| WI-3
|  | Kind (D)
| 
| 
| 
| 
| 
| style="background:#66f" | Kind (D)

|-
| WI-7
|  | (Obey) (D)
| 
| 
| 
| 
| 
| style="background:#f66" | Duffy (R)

|-
| WI-8
|  | Kagen (D)
| 
| 
| 
| 
| 
| style="background:#f66" | Ribble (R)

|- valign=top
! District
! Incumbent
! Cook
! Rothenberg
! CQ Politics
! Sabato's CrystalBall
! RealClear
! Winner

Notes

References 

House